The 1995 Edmonton municipal election was held October 16, 1995 to elect a mayor and twelve aldermen to sit on Edmonton City Council, nine trustees to sit on the public school board, and seven trustees to sit on the separate school board.  Edmontonians also decided two plebiscite questions.

Councillors were elected in two-seat wards.

This was the first election in which the public school board used nine wards instead of six to elect its trustees.

Electoral system
Mayor was elected through First past the post.

Councillors were elected through Plurality block voting, two per ward, where each voter could cast up to two votes.

School board positions also were filled through Plurality block voting as well.

Voter turnout

There were 221,236 ballots cast out of 440,044 eligible voters, for a voter turnout of 50.3%.

Results

(bold indicates elected, italics indicate incumbent)

Mayor

Aldermen

Public school trustees

Separate (Catholic) school trustees

One trustee is elected from each ward, and the non-victorious candidate with the most total votes is also elected.

Plebiscites

Edmonton Municipal Airport

Do you direct City Council to repeal "The Edmonton Municipal Airport referendum bylaw" (No. 10,205)?  That bylaw requires the City to operate the Municipal Airport and promote that airport's air passenger service.

A "YES" vote means that the City will promote MOVING scheduled air passenger service to the Edmonton International Airport.

A "NO" vote means that the City will promote MAINTAINING scheduled air passenger service at the Edmonton Municipal Airport.

Under both options the City will continue to own and offer general air services (e.g. private planes, small charters, air ambulance) at the Municipal Airport.

Keillor Road

Do you direct City Council to PASS the Keillor Road Referendum Bylaw (No. 11, 124)?

A "YES" vote means the City must leave Keillor Road OPEN to traffic, including motor vehicle traffic.

A "NO" vote means City should CLOSE Keillor Road.

References

External links

City of Edmonton: Edmonton Elections

1995
1995 elections in Canada
1995 in Alberta